Tan Sri Datuk Seri Panglima Osu bin Sukam (Jawi: اوسو بن سوكم; born 19 February 1949) is a Malaysian politician who served as the 12th Chief Minister of Sabah from March 1999 to March 2001, Member of Parliament (MP) for Papar from August 1986 to March 2004 and Member of the Sabah State Legislative Assembly (MLA) for Kawang from February 1994 to March 2004. Following the rotation system in place at that time, Osu, an ethnic Bajau, held the post for two years representing the Muslim bumiputras of Sabah. In 2001, he was replaced by Chong Kah Kiat. Until 14 July 2005, he was a member of a ruling United Malays National Organisation (UMNO).

Election results

Controversy

Gambling debt 
He resigned from his party of UMNO due to gambling debts totalling at least US$1.8 million he accumulated from Ritz Hotel Casino in London and another casino. The casino obtained a judgment in the High Court in England to recover debts owed by Osu. The casino sought to enforce the judgment in Malaysia by registering the judgment in the High Court of Sabah and Sarawak in July 2005. The High Court at Kota Kinabalu refused to register the judgment on grounds of public policy. However, in 2007, the Court of Appeal ruled in favour of the casino allowing the debt to be recovered.

Honours

 :
  Commander of the Order of Loyalty to the Crown of Malaysia (PSM) – Tan Sri (2022)

  :
  Commander of the Order of Kinabalu (PGDK) - Datuk (1994)
  Grand Commander of the Order of Kinabalu (SPDK) - Datuk Seri Panglima (1997)
  :
  Knight Commander of the Order of the Star of Hornbill Sarawak (DA) - Datuk Amar (1999)

References 

Government ministers of Malaysia
Bajau people
People from Sabah
Knights Commander of the Order of the Star of Hornbill Sarawak
Chief Ministers of Sabah
Sabah state ministers
United Malays National Organisation politicians
Malaysian Muslims
Living people
Alumni of the University of Buckingham
Members of the Dewan Rakyat
Grand Commanders of the Order of Kinabalu
Commanders of the Order of Kinabalu
Members of the Sabah State Legislative Assembly
1949 births
Commanders of the Order of Loyalty to the Crown of Malaysia